Huta is a village in Rivne Raion, Rivne Oblast, Ukraine, but was formerly administered within Kostopil Raion. As of the year 2001, the community had 744 residents. Postal code — 35010. KOATUU code — 5623481201.

The Ukrainian poet Petro Velesyk was born in this village.

References 

Villages in Rivne Raion